Oowah Lake is a small  lake located in the Manti-La Sal National Forest, in Utah. The Department of Wildlife Resources of Utah (DWR) stocks this reservoir with rainbow trout.

References

Lakes of Utah
Manti-La Sal National Forest